The UAAP Season 85 basketball tournaments are the University Athletic Association of the Philippines (UAAP) basketball tournaments for the 2022–23 school year.

The collegiate men's and women's tournaments began on October 1, 2022.

The high school boys' tournament began on January 15, 2023, for the first time since the COVID-19 pandemic.

Tournament format 
The UAAP continued to use the UAAP Final Four format.

Fr. Aldrin Suan, UAAP president, said that the league reverted to its pre-pandemic Wednesday, Saturday and Sunday schedule.

The league also included a "head coaches' challenge" based on the FIBA challenge system. This gives each team one challenge per game to review questionable calls by the officials.

Dickie Bachmann, former Alaska Aces governor in the Philippine Basketball Association, was appointed as the UAAP basketball commissioner for this season. Bachmann's term as basketball commissioner was supposed to last until the league's 86th season but he foregone the position as he was appointed as the new Philippine Sports Commission chairman. Ronnie Magsanoc was named commissioner to replace Bachmann. Xaxy Nunag was eventually named Bachmann's permanent replacement.

Teams

Name changes 

 Ateneo Lady Eagles and Ateneo Blue Eaglets: On May 5, 2022, Ateneo announced that all of its UAAP teams, regardless of gender, sport or division will now be called the "Blue Eagles".

Coaching changes

Venues 

The UAAP released its schedule on September 28. Opening weekend is at SM Mall of Asia Arena in Pasay, with games at PhilSports Arena in Pasig, Araneta Coliseum in Quezon City, and at the Ynares Center in Antipolo, Rizal.

For Wednesday quadrupleheaders, the women's tournament will play at the Quadricentennial Pavilion in UST's Manila campus; on all other game days, the women's teams will play on the same venue and day as their corresponding men's team.

For the boys' tournament, the Filoil EcoOil Centre in San Juan was scheduled to host all but one gamedays, with the San Andres Sports Complex in Manila hosting one gameday. Eventually, Paco Arena, also in Manila, hosted several elimination round gamedays.

Squads 
Each team has a 20-player roster, of which four are reserves. Only one foreign student athlete (FSA) or import is allowed to be on the active roster.

Imports 

Note

Men's tournament

Elimination round

Team standings

Match-up results

Scores 
Results on top and to the right of the grey cells are for first-round games; those to the bottom and to the left of it are second-round games.

Postponed games:
 October 29 men's games (UST vs. La Salle, Ateneo vs. Adamson) were postponed due to Tropical Storm Paeng.

Fourth seed playoff 
La Salle and Adamson finished the elimination round tied for fourth. This is a one-game playoff to determine the #4 seed.

Bracket

Semifinals 
UP and Ateneo have the twice-to-beat advantage which means they have to win only once, and their opponents twice in the semifinals to advance to the Finals.

Ateneo vs. Adamson 
The Ateneo Blue Eagles qualified for their eighth consecutive Final Four appearance, and their sixth consecutive tournament with the twice-to-beat advantage – the longest active streak in the Final Four era of UAAP men's basketball. Adamson returns to the Final Four for the first time since 2018.

UP vs. NU 
This is the first meeting between UP and NU in the semifinals in UAAP men's basketball history. UP is in its fourth straight playoffs appearance, and its third consecutive tournament with the twice-to-beat advantage. The NU Bulldogs returned to the semifinals for the first time since 2015 after missing out the past 5 seasons.

Finals 
The Finals is a best-of-three series. This is the second consecutive (and third overall) Battle of Katipunan finals. For the first time in the Final Four era of UAAP men's basketball, UP clinched their second consecutive finals appearance. Ateneo clinched their sixth consecutive finals appearance – the school's longest overall championship appearance streak in UAAP men's basketball.

 Finals Most Valuable Player:

Awards 

The awards were handed out prior to Game 2 of the Finals at the Araneta Coliseum.

 Most Valuable Player: 
 Rookie of the Year: 
 Mythical Five:
 
 
 
 
 
 Lazada Swag Player of the Season: 
 PSBankable Player of the Season:

Players of the Week 
The Collegiate Press Corps awards a "player of the week" on Tuesdays for performances on the preceding week.

Player suspensions 
 Adama Faye of the UST Growling Tigers for an unsportsmanlike foul against Luis Villegas of the UE Red Warriors. He served his one-game suspension in the game of UST versus FEU Tamaraws.
 CJ Austria of the De La Salle Green Archers for an unsportsmanlike foul against Patrick Sleat of the FEU Tamaraws. He served his one-game suspension in the game of La Salle versus NU Bulldogs.
 Evan Nelle of the De La Salle Green Archers for an unsportsmanlike foul against Jerom Lastimosa of the Adamson Soaring Falcons. He served his one-game suspension in the game of La Salle versus FEU Tamaraws.
 Kean Baclaan of the NU Bulldogs for faking a foul against De La Salle Green Archers. He served his one-game suspension in the game of NU versus Adamson Soaring Falcons.

Statistical leaders 
Statistical leaders' averages after the elimination round.

Statistical points leaders

Player game highs

Player season highs

Team game highs

Team season highs

Women's tournament

Elimination round 
The NU Lady Bulldogs' 108-game winning streak – the longest by any sporting team in UAAP history – was snapped by the De La Salle Lady Archers on November 24, when the Lady Archers won in overtime, 61–57. NU's last defeat was in the 2013 Finals also against La Salle.

Team standings

Match-up results

Scores 
Results on top and to the right of the grey cells are for first-round games; those to the bottom and to the left of it are second-round games.

Bracket

Semifinals 
NU and La Salle have the twice-to-beat advantage, which means they have to win only once, and their opponents twice in the semifinals to advance to the Finals.

NU vs. Ateneo 
The NU Lady Bulldogs have qualified to the Final Four anew. Their second round loss to La Salle meant that the Final Four will be played in the usual format for first time since 2013. The Ateneo Blue Eagles booked the last ticket to the Final Four. This is their first playoffs appearance since 2015.

La Salle vs. UST 
The De La Salle Lady Archers and UST Tigresses have qualified to the Final Four.

Finals 
The Finals is a best-of-three series. NU qualified to its eighth consecutive Finals. La Salle, meanwhile, enters the Finals for the first time since UAAP Season 79.

 Finals Most Valuable Player:

Awards 

The awards were handed out prior to Game 2 of the Finals at the SM Mall of Asia Arena.
 Most Valuable Player: 
 Rookie of the Year: 
 Mythical Five:

Players of the Week 
The Collegiate Press Corps awards a "player of the week" on Tuesdays for performances on the preceding week.

Player suspensions 
 Fina Niantcho Tchuido of the De La Salle Lady Archers for an unsportsmanlike foul against Kristine Cayabyab of NU Lady Bulldogs. She served her one-game suspension in the game of La Salle versus UE Lady Red Warriors.
 Sarah Makanjuola of the Ateneo Blue Eagles for an unsportsmanlike foul against Kamba Kone of UE Lady Red Warriors. She served her one-game suspension in the game of Ateneo versus UP Fighting Maroons.

Statistical leaders 
Statistical leaders' averages after the elimination round.

Statistical points leaders

Player game highs

Player season highs

Team game highs

Team season highs

Boys' tournament 
The juniors' tournament will also be a qualifying tournament for the 2023 National Basketball Training Center (NBTC) championship, with the champions qualifying. However, with the UAAP championship series being held in the same week as the NBTC championship, the NBTC decided to give the berths given to the UAAP to its losing semifinalists.

De La Salle University is the sub-host for this tournament.

Elimination round

Team standings

Match-up results

Scores 
Results on top and to the right of the grey cells are for first-round games; those to the bottom and to the left of it are second-round games.

Bracket

Semifinals 
Adamson and FEU have the twice-to-beat advantage in the semifinals, They only need to win once while their opponents twice in order to qualify in the Finals.

Adamson vs. UST 
Adamson qualified to the Final Four after winning in its tenth game. UST clinched its semifinal berth by winning in its penultimate game. The Baby Falcons clinched the twice-to-beat advantage by winning its elimination round finale against the Tiger Cubs.

FEU-D vs. NSNU 
The Baby Tamaraws clinched a Final Four berth when it won its ninth game out of 11.

Finals 
The finals is a best-of-three playoff.

Adamson qualified to its first Finals berth in 20 years. FEU Diliman made it to the Finals for the second consecutive tournament (lost to NSNU in 2019).

 Finals Most Valuable Player:

Awards 
  
The awards were handed out prior to Game 2 of the Finals at the Filoil EcoOil Centre.

 Most Valuable Player: 
 Rookie of the Year: 

 Mythical Five:

Overall championship points

Collegiate division 

In case of a tie, the team with the higher position in any tournament is ranked higher. If both are still tied, they are listed by alphabetical order.

How rankings are determined:
 Ranks fifth to eighth determined by elimination round standings.
 Loser of the #1 vs #4 semifinal match-up is ranked fourth
 If stepladder: Loser of stepladder semifinals round 1 is ranked fourth
 Loser of the #2 vs #3 semifinal match-up is ranked third
 If stepladder: Loser of stepladder semifinals round 2 is ranked third
 Loser of the finals is ranked second
 Champion is ranked first

See also 
 NCAA Season 98 basketball tournaments

References 

UAAP basketball tournaments
2022–23 in Philippine college basketball
September 2022 sports events in the Philippines
October 2022 sports events in the Philippines
November 2022 sports events in the Philippines
December 2022 sports events in the Philippines
January 2023 sports events in the Philippines
February 2023 sports events in the Philippines
March 2023 sports events in the Philippines